The Writers Guild of America Award for Television: Documentary Script – Other Than Current Events is an award presented by the Writers Guild of America to the best writing in a documentary about topics other than current events. It was first awarded at the 40th Writers Guild of America Awards, being the program The Grizzlies the inaugural winner of the category.

Winners and nominees

1980s

1990s

2000s

2010s

2020s

Programs with multiple wins
 18 awards
 American Experience (PBS)

 4 awards
 Nova (PBS)
 Frontline (PBS)

Programs with multiple nominations
 59 nominations
 American Experience (PBS)

 15 nominations
 Frontline (PBS)

 13 nominations
 Nova (PBS)

 4 nominations
 American Masters (PBS)

 2 nominations
 Founding Fathers (History Channel)

See also
 Primetime Emmy Award for Outstanding Writing for a Nonfiction Programming

References

External links 
 

American documentary film awards
Writers Guild of America Awards